WQBG (100.5 FM, "Bigfoot Country") is a country music formatted radio station licensed to serve Elizabethville, Pennsylvania. The station is owned by Seven Mountains Media, through licensee Southern Belle, LLC, and is operated out of studios in Selinsgrove, Pennsylvania. It serves areas along the Susquehanna River south of Selinsgrove.  The station operates in simulcast with sister stations WRBG and WCFT-FM. Although also owned by Seven Mountains Media, WQBG and its three other simulcasting frequencies feature different programming than WIBF and WDBF, which are also branded as Bigfoot Country.

Studios
Bigfoot Country's main studio is located at 450 Route 204 Highway in Selinsgrove. Bigfoot Country, along with its sister stations, operates a public studio located inside the Susquehanna Valley Mall located in Hummels Wharf.

Coverage area
WQBG, based in Elizabethville, serves the southern area of the Bigfoot Country network. Its coverage area includes northern Dauphin County, northeast Perry County, eastern Juniata County, eastern Snyder County, and southern Northumberland County. The towns of Selinsgrove, Herndon, and Millersburg are served.

Programming
WQBG on-air personalities include Mark Roberts, Shelly Marx, Todd Stewart, and Jeff Shaffer. Weekday programming includes The B Breakfast Bunch with Mark and Shelly, Todd Stewart on mid-days, Monica on afternoons, Kyle Alexander on nights, and "Big Country Variety" overnight. Specialty weekend programs include Power Source Country, Voice Of Prophecy, Max Potential, NAC, ZMAX Racing Country, NASCAR USA, and CMT Radio Insider.

Bigfoot Country is an affiliate of Penn State Sports Properties from Learfield Sports and broadcasts Penn State Nittany Lions football, both at home and on the road, every Saturday during the college football season in place of regularly scheduled programming. The station is an affiliate of Motor Racing Network and Performance Racing Network and broadcasts every race (except the Brickyard 400) during the NASCAR Sprint Cup Season in place of regularly scheduled programming during race weekends along with NASCAR-oriented programming on Sundays throughout the year.

Previous logo

See also
 WCFT-FM
 WRBG (FM)
 WNNA

External links
 

QBG
Country radio stations in the United States
Dauphin County, Pennsylvania
Radio stations established in 1990
1990 establishments in Pennsylvania